Philippe Charlier is a French coroner, forensic pathologist and paleopathologist.

Biography
Charlier was born in Meaux on 25 June 1977. His father is a doctor, his mother a pharmacist. He made his first dig at the age of 10, when he found a human skull. He studied archaeology and art history at the Michelet Institute and was part of the forensic department at Raymond Poincaré University Hospital. His work has focused on the study of the remains of Richard Lionheart, Agnès Sorel, Fulk III, Count of Anjou, Diane de Poitiers, relics of Louis IX scattered in France, false relics of Joan of Arc, and the presumed head of Henry IV. In 2017, he reconfirmed the authenticity of Adolf Hitler's dental remains.

References

1977 births
French pathologists
Paleopathologists
French coroners
People from Meaux
Living people